Libra Radio is a radio station broadcasting from Taiwan(Republic of China, Lienchiang Country Nangan Township. Libra Radio, formerly known as "Matsu Life Radio," was founded in 2004. In October 2008, it officially changed its name to the Libra Radio. Libra Radio is the first privately owned radio station, and also the first agency of broadcasting advertising business and mainland tourists to Taiwan travel business to partner with a radio station in Mainland China (People's Republic of China) through a cooperative agreement.

Introduction
 Broadcasting station transmitting frequency：FM98.5 (People's Republic of China)
 Chairperson : Ms. Shu-Hua Chu
 Launch station : Lienchiang Country Nangan Township.
 Headquarters : No.40, Ln. 40, Sec. 2, Shuangshi Rd., North Dist., Taichung City 40455, Taiwan (Republic of China)
 Language: Mandarin Chinese, English and Taiwanese dialect (North), supplemented.

Organization
 Libra Radio Broadcasting Company
 Libra Radio news service：Provide News service between China(People's Republic of China)and Taiwan(Republic of China)
 Owned and operated by the Baulin Co., Ltd.： Provide propagation service，commercial advertising agent and commercial trade.

News 
 Voice of strait Broadcasting Station and Libra radio press the signing of cooperation agreements
 The two sides to join hands in broadcasting expand the tourism advertising market
 Voice of strait Broadcasting Station and Libra radio cross-strait co-launched “the 2008 the Olympic selection event prizes Star”

References 
 National Communications Commission

External links
 Libra Radio Homepage
 Libra Radio on hiChannel
 Libra Radio on Favorite audio-visual

Radio stations established in 2004
Radio stations in Taiwan